Richard Martin Bingham, TD, QC (26 October 1915 – 26 July 1992) was a British barrister and politician who later served as a judge.

Education and Army career
Educated at Harrow and Clare College, Cambridge, Bingham was a Major in the Royal Artillery during the Second World War. However, he found the time to finish his legal training and was called to the Bar (Inner Temple) in 1940. His wartime service included Dunkirk and north-western Europe; he was mentioned in dispatches in 1944. He had been in the Territorial Army since 1937, where he served with the 59th Medical Regiment until 1949; he held the rank of Major from 1945.

Politics
He did not begin legal practice until demobilised in 1946, when he joined the Northern Circuit. In the same year he was elected as a Conservative Party member of Liverpool City Council, on which he served for three years. In 1957, Bingham was elected to Parliament as Conservative MP for Liverpool Garston at a byelection.

Legal career
The author of a standard work on negligence cases, his legal career progressed with appointment as Recorder of Oldham in 1960, and as a 'Bencher' of the Inner Temple in 1964. Bingham became a Judge of Appeal on the Isle of Man in 1965 and was also appointed to a Home Office departmental committee on Coroners. Bingham stood down from Parliament at the 1966 general election, and was appointed to the Royal Commission on Assizes and Quarter Sessions.

In 1972 Bingham was appointed a Circuit Judge and resigned his post on the Isle of Man. He served as a Judge for 16 years.

References
M. Stenton and S. Lees, "Who's Who of British MPs" Vol. IV (Harvester Press, 1981)
Who Was Who.

External links 
 

1915 births
1992 deaths
Alumni of Clare College, Cambridge
Manx judges
Royal Artillery officers
British Army personnel of World War II
Conservative Party (UK) MPs for English constituencies
Councillors in Liverpool
UK MPs 1955–1959
UK MPs 1959–1964
UK MPs 1964–1966
Members of the Parliament of the United Kingdom for Liverpool constituencies
Members of the Inner Temple
20th-century English judges
People educated at Harrow School